Drsti-srsti is a subschool of Advaita Vedanta, possibly started by Maṇḍana Miśra (8th c. CE). It holds that the "whole world of things is the object of mind," and influenced the Yoga Vasistha.

Etymology
 drsti - view, interpretation of experience
 sṛṣṭi - creation

See also
 View (Buddhism)

References

Advaita Vedanta
Dvaita Vedanta